Jacob Elordi (born 26 June 1997) is an Australian actor. He is known for his roles as Noah Flynn in Netflix's The Kissing Booth teen film franchise and Nate Jacobs in the HBO series Euphoria.

Early life
Elordi was born on 26 June 1997, in Brisbane, Queensland, Australia, to John and Melissa Elordi. His father emigrated from the Basque Country at the age of eight. He has three older sisters. He attended the Catholic secondary schools of St. Kevin's College, Melbourne and of St Joseph's College, Nudgee in Brisbane.

Career
Elordi's first experience on a Hollywood film set was in Pirates of the Caribbean: Dead Men Tell No Tales as an extra. His first acting role was on the Australian film Swinging Safari in 2018, playing the role of Rooster. Elordi came to fame starring as Noah Flynn in the Netflix romantic comedy film The Kissing Booth, which premiered in May 2018. He reprised the role in the sequel The Kissing Booth 2, which filmed in mid-2019 in Cape Town, South Africa, and was released in July 2020. He also starred in the third film in the series, The Kissing Booth 3, which was released on Netflix on 11 August 2021.

In 2019, Elordi starred in the horror film The Mortuary Collection and began playing Nate Jacobs in the HBO television series Euphoria. In 2022, Elordi appeared in Adrian Lyne's erotic thriller Deep Water.

Elordi is set to star in Emerald Fennell's upcoming thriller Saltburn and in cinematographer Sean Price Williams' The Sweet East. He is set to play Elvis Presley in the upcoming film Priscilla.

Filmography

Film

Television

References

External links
 

1997 births
21st-century Australian male actors
Australian male film actors
Australian male television actors
Australian people of Spanish descent
Living people
Male actors from Brisbane
People educated at St Joseph's College, Nudgee
People educated at St Kevin's College, Melbourne
Australian people of Basque descent